Marija Škaričić  (born 6 August 1977) is a Croatian actress.

Biography 
Marija Škaričić was born on August 6, 1977 in Split. She ended Primary and Secondary school in Split. As a high school student, she attended Gradsko kazalište mladih. In the third attempt she graduated at Academy of Dramatic Arts, where she graduated in 2003. Already since 2001 she had professional performances in the play HNK Split, Rijeka, National Theatre, and Žar ptica.

Her first lead role gets in 2004 in the movie A Wonderful Night in Split, directed by Arsen Anton Ostojić. For formal recognition of such status made sure the jury Sarajevo Film Festival with Mike Leigh at the helm, awarding her the same year the Heart of Sarajevo, the prestigious award for best female actor achievement.

New real acting takes a running start in one of the biggest Croatian commercial success, the film What Is a Man Without a Moustache?, directed by Hrvoje Hribar.

2006 revives old love with Sarajevo taking away a second time with the local festivals Heart of Sarajevo for Best Actress in the film Das Fräulein, directed by Andrea Staka. Marija played a young girl Ana from Sarajevo who is going to make a friendship with Serbian woman Ruža. Marija Škaričić in that film played with Mirjana Karanović and Ljubica Jović.

The following are many small movie roles in a number of Croatian films and lead roles gets 2010 year in the German film Shahada (which was in competition with the Berlin International Film Festival), and then in the film of Dalibor Matanić - Mother of Asphalt. For this role she was awarded the Golden Arena for Best Actress at the 57th Pula Film Festival and Azimut D'OR Grand Prize for Best Actress at the International Festival of Audiovisual Programs in Paris.

During this period, Marija Škaričić was one of the busiest and most awarded Croatian film actresses.

She also acted in serials Operation Kajman and Bumerang.

In 2010 Journal Globus proclaimed her as one of the leaders of Croatian film (together with Daria Lorenci, Zrinka Cvitešić, Leona Paraminski, Nataša Janjić and Jadranka Đokić).

At 61st International Film Festival in Berlin, she was officially awarded this recognition. Škaričić is second Croatian actress who won that prize and that collection have many European film stars such as Daniel Craig, Anamaria Marinca, Daniel Brühl, Rachel Weisz, Carey Mulligan and many others.

Awards and nominations

Filmography

Movie roles

Television roles

References

External links 
 

Croatian actresses
1977 births
Actors from Split, Croatia
Living people
Golden Arena winners